Sir Gerald Edward Barling (born 18 September 1949), styled The Hon. Mr Justice Barling, is a retired judge of the High Court of England and Wales.

He was educated at St. Mary's College, Blackburn and New College, Oxford.

He was called to the bar at Middle Temple in 1972. He was a judge of the High Court of Justice (Chancery Division) from 2007, and retired with effect from 19 September 2019.

References

1949 births
Living people
Alumni of New College, Oxford
Members of the Middle Temple
Chancery Division judges
Knights Bachelor